ne (for "nice editor") is a console text editor for POSIX computer operating systems such as Linux or Mac OS X. It uses the terminfo library, but it can also be compiled using a bundled copy of the GNU termcap implementation.  There is also a Cygwin version. It was developed by Sebastiano Vigna of the University of Milan.

ne is intended to provide an alternative to vi that will be more familiar to beginners  and modern users and still be portable across all POSIX-compliant operating systems, and remain usable on slow remote connections.

ne was originally developed on an Amiga 3000T using the curses library and was inspired by that platform's TurboText editor, which was written by Martin Taillefer. Development then moved to Linux in order to take advantage of the terminfo library. Todd Lewis joined the development team, donating code he wrote to add features required at the University of North Carolina at Chapel Hill, which implemented ne as part of their migration of their research computers from MVS to UNIX.. Daniele Filaretti helped with syntax highlighting using code derived from the Joe editor.

Version 2.6 adds narrowing for the file open screen, adds status indicators in the open documents list and improves syntax highlighting. Version 3.1.0 is fully 64-bit: file size and line length are limited only by the core memory and disk space available, as large files are memory mapped transparently.

Linux Voice has rated ne as the third best editor for Linux.

See also 

 List of text editors
 Comparison of text editors
 List of Unix commands

References

External links

Free software programmed in C
Unix text editors
MacOS text editors
Free text editors
Termcap
Console applications